Lintang may be, 

Lintang language
Kampung Lintang